Gale Eugene McArthur (March 6, 1929 – January 2, 2020) was an All-American basketball player at Oklahoma A&M University (now Oklahoma State).

McArthur, a  guard from Mangum, Oklahoma, attended Oklahoma A&M and played basketball for Hall of Fame coach Henry Iba from 1948 to 1951.  During his time in Stillwater, McArthur played on two Final Four teams, playing in the NCAA championship game in 1949 (a 46–36 loss to Kentucky) as a sophomore and the national semifinals as a senior in 1951.

In that senior year of 1950–51,  McArthur averaged 11.6 points per game and led the Aggies to a 29–6 record.  The team won the Missouri Valley Conference for the second time in McArthur's career.

After graduation from Oklahoma A&M, McArthur was drafted by the Minneapolis Lakers in the 1951 NBA draft.  However, McArthur opted for dental school instead, ultimately starting his own practice in Ponca City, Oklahoma. He died on January 2, 2020.

References

1929 births
2020 deaths
All-American college men's basketball players
American dentists
American men's basketball players
Basketball players from Oklahoma
Guards (basketball)
Minneapolis Lakers draft picks
Oklahoma State Cowboys basketball players
People from Mangum, Oklahoma
People from Ponca City, Oklahoma